African poetry encompasses the wide variety of traditions arising from Africa's 55 countries and from evolving trends within different literary genres. It is a large and complex subject, partly because of Africa's original linguistic diversity but primarily because of the devastating effect of slavery and colonization, which resulted in English, Portuguese and French, as well as Creole or pidgin versions of these European languages, being spoken and written by Africans across the continent.

As Anouk Ziljlma points out, "because there are literally thousands of indigenous languages spoken in Africa and many more dialects, every African country has an official language (or 11 in the case of South Africa). This official language acts as the 'lingua franca' for (at least) a reasonably sized region."

According to Prof. Joseph A. Ushie of the University of Uyo English department, in Uyo, Akwa Ibom State, Nigeria: "Modern written African poetry has a double heritage — pre-colonial and Western. As in most post-colonial situations, the tilt of our writing should be more towards the pre-colonial African literary heritage as manifested in the song, dirge, folktale, elegy, panegyric or riddle. Essentially, such art was meant for the whole community rather than for a few initiates."

Historical perspective
This perspective contextualises the historical, political and indigenous cultural dynamics that shaped both the written and oral forms of literature (orature) of Africa past and present. If African orature depends on community and social setting, it can be said that ore "grows out of tradition and keeps tradition alive".
Present-day spoken-word and performance poetry, with its multidimensional forms of expression incorporating song, story-telling narratives, rhythm, rhyme, verse, movement/dance plus the modern media forms of digital recording, composition and video projection, can be viewed as logical evolutions of the ancient indigenous oral traditions. Since 2000 the Internet has also emerged as a publishing channel for the promotion of both written and performed African poetry.

Pre-colonial era
Numerous examples of pre-colonial African literature span the continent, from scripts documenting the kings of Ethiopian and Ghanaian empires, as well as popular folklore in a host of native languages, through to Mali's famous Timbuktu Manuscripts, dating from the 16th to 18th centuries, with a wide array of subject matter, including astronomy, poetry, law, history, faith, politics and philosophy. In medieval times the universities of North Africa amassed Arabic and Swahili literature.

Poetry as an art form has undergone several phases of evolution from pre-colonial to colonial and then to post-colonial eras in most African countries. As an example, in the pre-colonial era in Nigeria — the most populated country in Africa and a multi-ethnic, multi-lingual nation — poetry was unwritten. "There existed a thin line between poets and musicians, who composed and rendered poetry in musical form. Poets then published their works in the form of renditions at funerals and marriage ceremonies, with themes focused on praising virtues and condemning vices in society." Margaret Busby's 1992 anthology Daughters of Africa begins with a selection of traditional African poems, including Ancient Egyptian love songs.

Colonial era
While the West bears record of African literature from the period of colonisation and the slave trade, particularly of works by Africans using acquired Western languages as their medium of expression, the thriving oral traditions of the time – particularly if in a mother tongue, were not recognised for their artistic value or the richness and significance of their content.

Generated by the Atlantic slave trade and its opposition, from the 1780s onward, an astonishing and unprecedented array of texts appeared, both pro- and anti-slavery: poems, novels, plays, histories, sermons, speeches, newspaper columns and letters, travelogues, medical treatises, handbills, broadsides, songs, children's books. African authors writing in this period, along with the abolitionists and apologists, raise questions about the relation of British Romanticism to colonialism and slavery.
Themes of liberation, independence and négritude among Africans in French-controlled territories, began to permeate African literature in the late colonial period between the end of World War I and independence. Léopold Sédar Senghor published the first anthology of French-language poetry written by Africans in 1948. He was one of the leaders of the négritude movement and eventual President of Senegal.

Liberation struggle and Independence era
It is the political, economic, social and cultural events of a society that shape its literature. In his essay "Homecoming" (1972), Kenyan writer Ngũgĩ wa Thiong'o makes this stance very clear when he says:

 Literature does not grow or develop in a vacuum; it is given impetus, shape, direction and even area of concern by the social, political and economic forces in a particular society. The relationship between creative literature and other forces cannot be ignored especially in Africa, where modern literature has grown against the gory background of European imperialism and its changing manifestations: slavery, colonialism and neo-colonialism. Our culture over the last hundred years has developed against the same stunting, dwarfing background.

Many African poets suffered greatly and were compelled to cast aside their artistic vocations in order to be involved in the liberation struggles of their peoples. Christopher Okigbo was killed in the 1960s' civil war in Nigeria; Mongane Wally Serote was detained under South Africa's Terrorism Act No 83 of 1967; his countryman Arthur Norje committed suicide in London in 1970; Malawi's Jack Mapanje was incarcerated with neither charge nor trial; and in 1995, Ken Saro-Wiwa died by the gallows of the Nigerian junta.

Sam Awa of the University of Lagos' Department of English, states: "Moreover, African literature is protest in nature. It comes as a reaction to various forms of injustices meted out on Africans by the colonial masters and later, post-colonial masters."

Postcolonial African literature

 "To have any sense of evolving African poetics, one must be aware of the socio-political significance of literary expression and the ideological character of literary theory."

Most African nations gained their independence in the 1950s and 1960s and with liberation and increased literacy, African literature written in English, French and Portuguese and traditional African languages, has grown dramatically in quantity and in global recognition of this work. Ali A. Mazrui and others mention seven conflicts as themes: the clash between Africa's past and present, between tradition and modernity, between indigenous and foreign, between individualism and community, between socialism and capitalism, between development and self-reliance and between Africanity and humanity. Other themes in this period include social problems such as corruption, the economic disparities in newly independent countries, and the rights and roles of women. Female writers are today far better represented in published African literature than they were prior to independence.

Donna Seaman writes of The Heinemann Book of African Women's Poetry, edited by Frank Chipasula and Stella Chipasula (1995):

 The editors of this haunting anthology of poetry, both African-born poets themselves, have selected work by women poets from 18 African countries, from Algeria to Senegal, Mauritius and Zimbabwe. A historical note is struck by the anthology's oldest poem, an obelisk inscription composed by Queen Hatshepsut of Egypt, while a modern Egyptian poet, Andrée Chedid, epitomizes the dignity of the collection with her powerfully spare and provocative mediations. Unlike Queen Hatshepsut, most African women suffer tyranny, sexism and poverty and toil in silence and anonymity. Chedid writes, "Often from a point without place / I stifle my story / From past to future / I conjugate the horizon." For many of these poets, the world is unrelentingly cruel, and they belie their vulnerability with stoicism.
In 1986 Nigerian writer, poet and playwright, Wole Soyinka became the first post-independence African writer to win the Nobel Prize in Literature.

African poetry today

Since the 1960s, political, economic, and cultural events have begun to shape African poetry. Gone are the days when the shades of colonialism were an unending preoccupation of African poets. In modern African poetry, works that focus on the healing and purging of the country and families have dominated African poetry. Poets in Africa have faced issues in ways that not only explain how indigenous cultures are absorbed by western standards but also how limiting in vision their leaders have been. Emerging poets such as Tendai M. Shaba (Malawian) are changing the landscape with their unique forms of writing and storytelling. 

In January 2000, "Against All Odds: African Languages and Literatures into the 21st Century", the first conference on African languages and literatures ever to be held on African soil, took place, with participants from east, west, north, southern Africa and from the diaspora and by writers and scholars from around the world. Delegates examined the state of African languages in literature scholarship, publishing, and education in Africa, celebrating the vitality of African languages and literatures.

Poet and editor Kwame Dawes directed the African Poetry Book Fund and produced a series of chapbooks on emerging voices in Africa.

Publication
Over the last two decades, aside from individual collections of poetry by African writers, established literary reviews and journals featuring these poets, a significant number of anthologies of African poetry have been published, predominantly by university presses around the world and increasingly by African scholars based or associated with these institutions. 
In his article "The Critical Reception of Modern African Poetry" Oyeniyi Okunoye of Obafemi Awolowo University, Ile-Ife, Nigeria, criticises publications such as Modern Poetry from Africa, co-edited by Gerald Moore and Ulli Beier (1963), and A Book of African Verse by John Reed and Clive Wake (1969), "for operating within a tradition that is pretentious in claiming the African identity for works that do not truly project diverse African experiences".

By contrast, more recent anthologies not only document the evolution of African poetry with greater objectivity and insight but they are bringing to light and ever-expanding range of African voices. They reflect greater cultural, gender, generational diversity and a widening scope of themes, styles, and ideologies, as well as alternative framing of these works by virtue of their editorial approaches. 
A few notable anthologies of this kind are The New African Poetry: An Anthology, which launched its fifth edition in 2007, The New Century of South African Poetry (ed. Michael Chapman, 2002), New Poets of West Africa (ed. Tijan M. Sallah, 1995), The Trickster's Tongue: An Anthology of Poetry in Translation from Africa (2007) and the African Diaspora by Mark de Brito. Works of literary criticism and academic investigation are equally important in understanding and appreciating African poetry and Ideology and Form in African Poetry: Implications for Communication and Coming Home: Poems of Africa, the works of Emmanuel Ngara are particularly useful in this regard.

Also significantly contributing to this worldwide exposure of African poets, are online platforms and networks showcasing African poetry, such as Poetry Web International, Badilisha Poetry Radio and International PEN, all of which give spotlight to both the written and spoken-word forms, established and emerging voices from the African continent.

See also

 African literature
 List of African poets
 List of Tanzanian poets
 List of Ghanaian poets
 List of Nigerian poets
 List of South African poets
 South African poetry
 Pambazuka
 Badilisha Poetry X-Change and Badilisha Poetry Radio
 Africa Beyond
 Farafina Books

 Chimurenga (magazine)
 New Internationalist
 Wasafiri
 Kwani?
 Cassava Republic Press

References

External links 
 Book Live
 Badilisha Poetry Radio
 Africa Centre